György Kornis (February 26, 1927 in Miskolc – March 27, 2011 in Budapest) was a Hungarian painter. He studied in École des Beaux-Arts. His artistic style is  Abstract Surrealism, influenced by Henri Matisse and Pablo Picasso. From 1980 to 1990 he lived in Vienna and later in Budapest. He began his career as a 
stage designer at the Paris Opera.

Career
1946–1949 - stage designer of Paris Opera
1952 - he returned to Budapest
From 1957 - member of the Studio for Young Artists (Fiatal Művészek Stúdiója )
1988–2002 - lives and works in Vienna
Since 1994 - member of European Academy of Sciences and Arts
1997 - received a Merit Award of Hungary (Magyar Köztársasági Érdemrend)
2002 - he returned to Budapest

Important exhibitions
 1970 Sammlung Dieter, Frankfurt
 1973 Collegium Hungaricum, Vienna
 1974 Botsom Gallery, London
 1976 Galerie Bernard, Paris
 1983 Mednyánszky Terem, Budapest
 1987 Miskolci Galéria
 1988 Galerie De Pélichy, Brussels
 1989 1991, 1992 Galerie Sanner, Darmstadt
 1989 ASL Galerie, Ghent
 1993 Hotel Kempinsky, Budapest
 1995 Árkád Galéria, Budapest
 1997 Embassy of Hungarian Republic, Vienna
 2003 Vigadó Galéria, Budapest
 2004 Berlin
 2007 Hamilton Aulich Art Galéria, Budapest
 2007 Ernst Múzeum, Budapest

His artworks can be seen in the following museums
 Albertina museum of Vienna
 Fondation Jaques Brel, Brussels
 Hungarian National Gallery, Budapest
 Musée du Louvre, Paris
 Modern Hungarian Gallery, Pécs
 Museum of Christian Arts, Esztergom
 Museum of Modern Art Passau
 Museum Moderner Kunst, Ludwig Stiftung, Vienna
 Menton's Modern Art Museum
 Műterem Galéria (Buda Castle)
 T-Art Foundation, Budapest

References 
 Műterem Galéria
 KORNIS György | Artportal 
 Népszabadság Online: Kornis-képek születésnapra

1927 births
Hungarian painters
École des Beaux-Arts alumni
2011 deaths
Members of the European Academy of Sciences and Arts